The University of East Anglia Boat Club (UEABC) is the rowing club of the University of East Anglia in the UK. It currently has 60 members and rows year round from September to July.

Location & facilities
The boat club rows on the Yare River in Norwich, with the boathouse centred  from the University. The boat club benefits from 15 km of rowable river with room for the club's eights including a 2 km straight. Smaller boats can access a longer stretch of the river and it is possible to row all the way to the east coast.

The club has its main base on Whitlingham Lane, where is shares facilities with the local rowing and canoeing clubs, Norwich School and Norwich High School. In 2010 a new boathouse began construction for approximately £1,000,000.  The second phase which consists of fitting out the first floor area, including toilets, changing rooms and shower facilities; gym/fitness areas; kitchen; educational/meeting area; and a first aid/office completed in 2013. The boathouse was finished in 2016 and is used currently. The club has an arrangement so that members have access to Norwich School's large gym with free and fixed weights, cardio equipment and 8 model D Concept2 ergs. The club also has use of the UEA sportspark on campus.

Boats
Four 6s and four 4+s, including a Hudson USP8+ and Stämpfli 4+ for the top men's crews, and a Filippi 8+ for the top women's crew. Beginners enjoy using the Stampfli 8+ for the men and Wintech 8+ for the women. The boat club also has access to smaller boats throughout the year, along with coaching launches.

Racing

The Boat Club competes across the country in some of the oldest boat races in England with the men's and women's squads being equally successful such as:
Yare Cup 
Cambridge winter Head Im3 4+ winner 2017
Norfolk Sculls
Quintin Head
Bedford Head
BUCS Head Men's beg 8+ 7th 2018
Norwich Head 
Women's Head of the River Race
Head of the River Race 153rd 2018
BUCS Regatta Both Men's and Women's IM2 8+ semi-final 2011
Metropolitan Regatta
Peterborough Regatta Men's IM2 2- 2nd 2011
Marlow Regatta
Bedford Regatta Women's Novice 8+ won 2011
Henley Women's Regatta 8+ to the semi-finals 2011
Henley Royal Regatta Men's 4+ qualified in 2009 and 8+ qualified in 2011

Full results of recent years can be found on the UEABC website.

Derby Day & Alumni Race
The boat club partakes in a Derby Day race against Essex University. Each year the Men's and Women's squad field an eight each and all years since have proved to be easy wins for UEABC. In 2018, due to the largely-diminished Essex university rowing club the men's event was cancelled and the women's squad partook in an erg relay which was an easy victory for UEA.

Training Camps

The Men's and Women's squad usually have an Easter Training Camp which allows for a very intensive training programme mainly consisting of several water outings each day. The programme usually consists of 1 on 1 coaching, regatta style starts, seat racing and timed pieces. Usually 2k tests are taken at this stage so that boats can be set for the regatta season. The men's squad tends to train at Dorney Lake for 4 days of rowing and socializing but also visits Banyoles, Spain. In 2014 they trained at Temple Sur Lot, France.

Social events

Blending with the top crews' training 8 times a week, the club has weekly social events. These usually consist of nights out, theme nights and meals, where both squads come together to have fun and to socialize. During the summer, BBQ's and more relaxed events are held where members can kick back and relax in the sun.
 
In addition to these events, the boat club has several formal events each year.

 The Christmas Ball takes place at the end of the first semester and is one of the biggest events. This is usually held at Castor Hall, Norwich. The Alumni race is also held on this weekend.
The boat club also has an Alumni meal during the Henley Royal Regatta where past students and current students are invited to an afternoon of food, drink and to watch the rowing.

See also
University rowing (UK)
British Universities & Colleges Sport

References

External links
University of East Anglia Boat Club
British Universities & Colleges Sport

University of East Anglia
East Anglia
1963 establishments in England
Rowing clubs in England
Sports clubs established in 1963